Les McDonald (14 July 1885 – 4 October 1955) was an  Australian rules footballer who played with St Kilda in the Victorian Football League (VFL).

Notes

External links 

1885 births
1955 deaths
Australian rules footballers from Victoria (Australia)
St Kilda Football Club players